Elio Castro Guadarrama (born 26 July 1988) is a Mexican professional footballer who plays as a midfielder for Salvadoran Primera División club Santa Tecla.

FIFA 15 
In FIFA 15, a modified version of his card with a 95 rating (up from his regular 65) was put into the Ultimate Team game mode as a tribute to YouTuber Castro1021 for raising thousands of dollars to help people with cancer. It said that he played for Manchester United, Castro1021's favorite club. This was one of the only times a non-footballer has gotten an Ultimate Team card, the others being former EA developer and YouTuber ChuBoi in FIFA 16, breast cancer survivor Kenton Doust in FIFA 17, and an EA developer's dog, Banner, also in FIFA 17 (ratings of 92, 95, and 100 and clubs of Manchester United, the Icons team, and Arsenal). In FIFA 21, Arsenal, Crystal Palace, and Fulham pre-academy recruit Zayn Ali Salman was given a Pro Player Card (rating unknown) of him wearing a Paris Saint-Germain shirt.

References

External links
 
 Elio Castro profile, Club Tijuana

Living people
1988 births
Association football midfielders
Santos Laguna footballers
Club Tijuana footballers
Dorados de Sinaloa footballers
FC Juárez footballers
Liga MX players
Ascenso MX players
Footballers from Oaxaca
Mexican footballers